Sânmărghita may refer to several villages in Romania:

 Sânmărghita, a village in Mica Commune, Cluj County
 Sânmărghita, a village in Sânpaul Commune, Mureș County